Leonardo Cordeiro de Lima Silva (born 27 September 1995), known as just Léo Cordeiro, is a Brazilian professional footballer who plays as a midfielder for Mafra in the Liga Portugal 2.

Professional career
On 6 June 2019, Cordeiro signed a professional contract with Gil Vicente. Cordeiro made his professional debut with Gil Vicente in a 1-1 Primeira Liga tie with S.C. Braga on 25 August 2019.

On 2 August 2022, Cordeiro signed with Mafra.

Personal life
Cordeiro is the brother of the footballer Leandrinho.

References

External links
 
 ZeroZero Profile

1995 births
Living people
Sportspeople from Minas Gerais
Brazilian footballers
Association football fullbacks
Rio Claro Futebol Clube players
Esporte Clube Água Santa players
Clube Atlético Tricordiano players
S.C. Espinho players
Gil Vicente F.C. players
U.D. Vilafranquense players
C.D. Mafra players
Liga Portugal 2 players
Primeira Liga players
Campeonato de Portugal (league) players
Brazilian expatriate footballers
Brazilian expatriate sportspeople in Portugal
Expatriate footballers in Portugal